Ladamarekiidae is an extinct family of Paleozoic fossil molluscs of uncertain position. it is not known if they are sea snails (Gastropoda, or Monoplacophora).

Taxonomy 
The taxonomy of the Gastropoda by Bouchet & Rocroi, 2005 categorizes Ladamarekiidae within the
Paleozoic molluscs of uncertain systematic position. This family is unassigned to superfamily. This family has no subfamilies.

Genera and species 
Genera and species in the family Ladamarekiidae include:
 Ladamarekia Horný, 1992 - type genus of the family Ladamarekiidae
 Ladamarekia miranda Horný, 1992
 Jardamarekia Frýda et al., 2011
 Jardamarekia enigma Frýda et al., 2011

References 

Prehistoric gastropods